Semakin is a Russian masculine surname, its feminine counterpart is Semakina. Notable people with the surname include:

Maksim Semakin (born 1983), Russian football player
Vitali Semakin (born 1976), Russian football player

Russian-language surnames